Amblyothele is a genus of spiders in the family Lycosidae. It was first described in 1910 by Simon. , it contains 8 species, all from Africa.

Species
Amblyothele comprises the following species:
Amblyothele albocincta Simon, 1910
Amblyothele atlantica Russell-Smith, Jocqué & Alderweireldt, 2009
Amblyothele ecologica Russell-Smith, Jocqué & Alderweireldt, 2009
Amblyothele hamatula Russell-Smith, Jocqué & Alderweireldt, 2009
Amblyothele kivumba Russell-Smith, Jocqué & Alderweireldt, 2009
Amblyothele latedissipata Russell-Smith, Jocqué & Alderweireldt, 2009
Amblyothele longipes Russell-Smith, Jocqué & Alderweireldt, 2009
Amblyothele togona Roewer, 1960

References

Lycosidae
Araneomorphae genera
Spiders of Africa